VLHS may refer to:
 Ban Huoeisay Airport, a public use airport in Ban Houayxay, Laos
 Valley Lutheran High School (Michigan), Saginaw, Michigan, United States
 Valley Lutheran High School (Phoenix, Arizona), United States